Luis Alonso Reyes (born September 6, 1959) is a U.S. businessman from El Salvador. Reyes has built two successful businesses in his adopted country of the United States. He co-owns Cactus Cantina and Lauriol Plaza, both in Washington DC. Reyes immigrated to The United States in 1977. Reyes has worked on multiple presidential races for the Farabundo Martí National Liberation Front (FMLN) in his native country of El Salvador.

Early life 
Reyes grew up in San Miguel, El Salvador. Reyes grew up in a small house with no indoor plumbing or running water. At a young age, Reyes realized he needed to give his struggling family a better life. Reyes left El Salvador in 1977 with only $150 to his name. Although he paid $450 to a coyote to smuggle him into the United States, the coyote abandoned Reyes and 54 others in the desert outside Piedras Negras, Mexico, near the Texas border. Without food or shelter for a total of five days, Reyes decided with four others to continue on into the United States.

Reyes worked in California picking tomatoes in the fields for about a year until he  made enough money to meet a friend in Washington DC.

He arrived in Washington DC on New Year's Day, 1978. He moved into a studio apartment with nine roommates. Reyes worked as a dish washer at a steak house. The majority of money he made he sent back to his family in El Salvador.

Personal life 
Reyes became a US Citizen in 1986 after his employer-sponsored him for residency.

In 1992 Reyes married Lorena Ruano, together they have two daughters, Claudia-Isabella, born in 1997, and Daniella-Fernanda, born in 2001.

Today, Luis resides in an elegant brick home in D.C.'s exclusive Forest Hills neighborhood with his wife and two daughters.

Business Ventures 
After years of living in the United States illegally, his employer sponsored Reyes for residency. By 1983 he had saved a total of $20,000 which he used to co-found Lauriol Plaza. After becoming a US Citizen in 1986, he and his business partner opened Cactus Cantina, For 16 Years Reyes and Sanches continually postponed their own paydays to reinvest every penny back into the restaurants. By the mid-'90s, Lauriol Plaza had become a DC institution. Both Reyes and Sanchez poured $4 Million dollars into building the first full-service restaurant of any type to be constructed from the ground up in the District in years. When the flagship restaurant in Dupont Circle opened their doors, the restaurant quickly became popular. The restaurant averages 2,100 meals served on any given weekend night. Unnamed sources have said that Lauriol Plaza on any given night makes upwards of $30,000. Reyes doesn't dispute the figure.

References

http://www.lauriolplaza.com https://www.inc.com/magazine/201211/alexandra-starr/luis-reyes-entrepreneur-as-revolutionary.html https://www.washingtonpost.com/archive/local/1999/08/09/restaurateurs-build-their-american-dream/6c84c0ff-bef8-424e-a78c-7b33ceea131d/

https://www.washingtoncitypaper.com/food/article/13008632/stuck-in-the-middling-with-you https://www.gettyimages.com/detail/news-photo/luis-reyes-a-salvadorian-business-owner-of-the-salvadorian-news-photo/904370586#luis-reyes-a-salvadorian-business-owner-of-the-salvadorian-and-latin-picture-id904370586

1959 births
Living people